Iranians or Iranian people may refer to:

 Iranian peoples, Indo-European ethno-linguistic group living predominantly in Iran and other parts of the Middle East and the Caucasus, as well as parts of Central Asia and South Asia
 Persians, Iranian ethnic group comprising over half of the population of Iran
 The nationals of Iran
 Iranian nationality law
 Demographics of Iran

See also
 Iranian (disambiguation)